Ruth Ridge is a black, rocky ridge 2.8 miles (4.5 km) long in a north–south direction, terminating at its south end in a small peak. The ridge forms the south end of Detroit Plateau and marks a change in the direction of the plateau escarpment along Nordenskjöld Coast on the east side of Graham Land where it turns west to form the north wall of Drygalski Glacier. Dr. Otto Nordenskjold, leader of the Swedish Antarctic Expedition, 1901–04, gave the name Cape Ruth, in honor of his sister, to what appeared to be a cape at the north side of Drygalski Glacier. The feature was determined to be a ridge in 1947 by the Falkland Islands Dependencies Survey (FIDS).

References
 SCAR Composite Antarctic Gazetteer.

Ridges of Graham Land
Nordenskjöld Coast